Montsor is a deserted hamlet located in the municipality of La Pobla de Segur, in Province of Lleida province, Catalonia, Spain. As of 2020, it has a population of 0.

Geography 
Montsor is located 123km north-northeast of Lleida.

References

Populated places in the Province of Lleida